The 1983 Speedway World Team Cup was the 24th edition of the FIM Speedway World Team Cup to determine the team world champions.

The final took place at the Vojens Speedway Center in Denmark. The host country Denmark won their third title.

Qualification

Tournament

See also
 1983 Individual Speedway World Championship
 1983 Speedway World Pairs Championship

References

Speedway World Team Cup
World Team Cup

pl:Drużynowe Mistrzostwa Świata na żużlu 1980